The Miss Hong Kong 2011 pageant was held in the TVB City on August 7, 2011. Fifteen delegates completed for the title. The winner was Rebecca Zhu, who competed at Miss Chinese International 2012. The first runner-up was Hyman Chu, and she represented Hong Kong in the Miss World 2011. The second runner-up was Whitney Hui, and she was the Hong Kong representative in the Miss International 2011.

Results

Placements

Special awards
Miss Photogenic: #3 Whitney Hui
Miss International Goodwill: #6 Nicole Leung
Miss Tourism Ambassador: #6 Nicole Leung
Miss Trendy Vision: #5 Rebecca Zhu

Special awards

Tourism Ambassador

Contestant list

See also
 Miss Hong Kong Pageant
 Miss Chinese International Pageant

References

Miss Hong Kong Pageants